Chromolaena odorata is a tropical and subtropical  species of flowering shrub in the family Asteraceae. It is native to the Americas, from Florida and Texas in the United States south through Mexico and the Caribbean to South America. It has been introduced to tropical Asia, West Africa, and parts of Australia.

Common names include Siam weed, rouge plant, Christmas bush, jack in the box, devil weed, common floss flower, rompe saragüey (in Spanish), Abani di egwu or Nsiibilibe (Igbo language), ewé Akíntọ́lá (Yorùbá) and triffid.

Description
Chromolaena odorata is a rapidly growing perennial herb. It is a multi-stemmed shrub which grows up to 2.5 m (100 inches) tall in open areas. It has soft stems but the base of the shrub is woody. In shady areas it becomes etiolated and behaves as a creeper, growing on other vegetation. It can then become up to 10 m (33 feet) tall. The plant is hairy and glandular and the leaves give off a pungent, aromatic odour when crushed. The leaves are opposite, triangular to elliptical with serrated edges. Leaves are 4–10 cm long by 1–5 cm wide (up to 4 x 2 inches). Leaf petioles are 1–4 cm long. The white to pale pink tubular flowers are in panicles of 10 to 35  flowers that form at the ends of branches. The seeds are achenes and are somewhat hairy. They are mostly spread by the wind, but can also cling to fur, clothes and machinery, enabling long distance dispersal. Seed production is about 80,000 to 90,000 per plant. Seeds need light to germinate. The plant can regenerate from the roots. In favorable conditions the plant can grow more than 3 cm per day.

Classification
It was earlier taxonomically classified under the genus Eupatorium, but is now considered more closely related to other genera in the tribe Eupatorieae.

Uses

A recent review indicates that the ethno-pharmacological, fungicidal, nematicidal importance of the plant and its use as a fallow species and as a soil fertility improvement plant in the slash and burn rotation system of agriculture has contributed to its continued use and spread in Nigeria.

Invasive species

Chromolaena odorata is considered an invasive weed of field crops and natural environments in its introduced range.  It has been reported to be the most problematic invasive species within protected rainforests in Africa.  In Western Africa it prevents regeneration of tree species in areas of shifting cultivation.  It affects species diversity in southern Africa. The plant's flammability affects forest edges.

In Sri Lanka it is a major weed in disturbed areas and coconut plantations.

Control
Biological control with a defoliating Arctiid moth was attempted in the 1970s.

A pilot study in the Ashanti region of Ghana introduced the moth Pareuchaetes pseudoinsulata to some effect.

A renewed call for coordinated biological control effort in Nigeria was made in 2014, to attempt to bring the plant back into an ecological equilibrium.

In Australia a systematic eradication programme with herbicide has been initiated.

The gall forming tephritid fly Cecidochares connexa was introduced into Guam from Indonesia in 1998 and is widespread across the island. Chromolaena odorata forms galls around the fly larvae that become a nutrient sink that diverts energy away from plant growth to provide nutritive tissue along the walls of the larval chamber. Between 1 and 7 larvae can be found in each gall.

History of introduction
In the nineteenth century Chromolaena odorata escaped from the botanical gardens at Dacca (India), Java (Indonesia) and Peradeniya (Sri Lanka).  In Western Africa the plant was accidentally introduced with forestry seeds.  It was introduced as an ornamental in Southern Africa, and was introduced to Ivory Coast in 1952 to control Imperata grasses.  It was first found in Queensland, Australia in 1994 and was perhaps introduced with foreign pasture seeds. Chromolaena odorata, also known as “devil weed,” was found on the east side of the Big Island (Hawai'i) earlier in 2021, the Hawaii Tribune-Herald reported on September 28, 2021.

Toxicity
Chromolaena odorata contains carcinogenic pyrrolizidine alkaloids.
It is toxic to cattle. 
It can also cause allergic reactions.
Recent research has shown the plant is larvicidal against all major mosquito vectors.

See also
 John Wyndham's The Day of the Triffids— the post-apocalyptic novel from which the plant receives one of its colloquial names

References

Further reading
 
 Raimundo, R. L. G., R. L. Fonseca, R. Schachetti-Pereira, A. T. Peterson & Thomas Michael Lewinsohn, 2007.Native and Exotic Distributions of Siamweed (Chromolaena odorata) Modeled Using the Genetic Algorithm for Rule-Set Production. Weed Science, 55 (1): 41–48 | Abstract 
 ”Siam weed or chromolaena (Chromolaena odorata)”, Weed Management Guide, . At http://www.environment.gov.au/biodiversity/invasive/weeds/publications/guidelines/alert/pubs/c-odorata.pdf
 Pierre Binggeli ”Chromolaena odorata (L.) King & Robinson (Asteraceae)”, 1997, at http://pages.bangor.ac.uk/~afs101/iwpt/web-sp4.htm
 Lalith Gunasekera, Invasive Plants: A guide to the identification of the most invasive plants of Sri Lanka, Colombo 2009, p. 116–117.

External links
 
 
 Queensland Government Factsheet
 

odorata
Medicinal plants of Central America
Flora of the Caribbean
Flora of Texas
Flora of Florida
Flora of Mexico
Flora of South America
Plants described in 1759
Invasive plant species in Sri Lanka
Medicinal plants of North America
Flora without expected TNC conservation status